The September 2012 Beytüşşebap attack in the Southeastern Anatolia Region of Turkey occurred on the night of September 2, 2012. According to Governor of Şırnak Province, the attack began 22.00, and he said that as a result of the attack nine Turkish soldiers died and eight soldiers were injured. One of the injured soldiers died later in Şırnak Hospital. In the following days clashes were reported to continue.

References

2012 in Turkey
Conflicts in 2012
History of Şırnak Province
Kurdistan Workers' Party attacks